William Francis Henry (born February 15, 1942) is an American Major League Baseball pitcher. In 2 career games, he had a 0-0 record, with a 0.00 ERA. He pitched in 3 innings in his 2 career games, allowing no hits and two walks. He batted and threw left-handed.

Henry was signed by the Yankees as an amateur free agent in 1964.

External links

1942 births
Living people
New York Yankees players
Major League Baseball pitchers
Baseball players from California
Asheville Tourists players
Columbus Confederate Yankees players
Florida Instructional League Yankees players
Greensboro Yankees players
Indianapolis Indians players
Shelby Yankees players
Syracuse Chiefs players
Seton Hall Pirates baseball players